It's All in Your Head may refer to:
It's All in Your Head (book), 2015 book about psychosomatic illness by Suzanne O'Sullivan
 “It’s All in Your Head”, an episode of Bear in the Big Blue House
It's All in Your Head (Eve 6 album), 2003 album
It's All in Your Head (Negativland album), 2014 studio album
It's All in Your Head FM, 2006 live album by Negativland
"It's All in Your Head" (song), 1996 single by Diamond Rio